The Religio-political currents and organizations in Iran is a Persian book by the Iranian author, Rasul Jafarian. The book describes the cultural and political events of Iran from the time of Mohammad Reza Pahlavi to the victory of the Islamic Revolution (1941 to 1979). More than 65 explanatory and critical notes have been written on this book. In the third edition of this book Ali Khamenei, Supreme Leader of Iran, wrote a note on the book's chapter that had written about Ali Shariati (an Iranian revolutionary and sociologist). The book has been reprinted over twenty times.

Subject
In this book, the author Rasul Jafarian, emphasizes the entry of clerics into the centers of Iran revolution struggle and their role by relying on religion in the field of culture and then politics. In the present book, he seeks to find an answer to the secret of the leadership of the clergy in Iranian Revolution in February 1979; Therefore, he argues about the root causes and how the clerical religious forces are in the leadership position of the Islamic revolution movement.

Structure
The book "Religio-political currents and organizations in Iran (From the arrival of Mohammad Reza Shah to the victory of the Islamic Revolution (1941 to 1979))", is written in an introduction and eight general chapters. These chapters are:

 Chapter One: The Return of Religion to Society and Politics fields
 Chapter Two: The Movement for Translating Social-Political Works of Arabic-Brotherhood into Persian
 Chapter Three: Active religious-political currents in the 1960s and early 1970s
 Chapter Four: Revolutionary Islam of the Mojahedine Khalq Organization
 Chapter Five: Hosseiniyeh Ershad and Dr. Shariati
 Chapter Six: Religio-political active groups and currents on the eve of the victory of the Islamic Revolution of Iran
 Chapter Seven: Prominent authors of religio-political works on the eve of the Islamic Revolution of Iran
 Chapter Eight: Revisionist currents in Shiite beliefs

Critique and review
The book "Religio-political currents and organizations in Iran (From the arrival of Mohammad Reza Shah to the victory of the Islamic Revolution (1941 to 1979))" has been reported, analyzed, reviewed and criticized several times so far.

See also
 Atlas of Shia
 The specialized library on Islam and Iran
 Bibliography of Rasul Jafarian
 History of Islamic Iran
 Political History of Islam
 The intellectual and political life of Shia Imams
 Reflection on the Ashura movement

References

External links
 Religio-political currents and organizations in Iran (first edition) on Goodreads
 Religio-political currents and organizations in Iran on Goodreads
 Religio-political currents and organizations in Iran (another edition) on Goodreads
 Rasul Jafarian - Google Scholar
 Rasul Jafarian articles in English on SID
 Rasul Jafarian English articles on Magiran

Rasul Jafarian's books
Books about the Iranian Revolution
Books of Islam and politics
History books about Iran
Iranian books
Works about Ali Shariati
Works about Ruhollah Khomeini